Pablo Ocampo Tecson (born Pablo Tecson y Ocampo; July 4, 1859 – April 30, 1940) was an officer in the Revolutionary Army serving under Gen. Gregorio del Pilar (responsible for the eventual surrender of the Spanish forces) and a representative to the Malolos Congress. He was elected the Governor General of Bulacan immediately following the Philippine–American War. Tecson later served as Insular Secretary of the Philippine Bureau of Agriculture.

Early life and education
Pablo Tecson was born July 4, 1859 in San Miguel de Mayumo, Bulacan, Philippines; the son of Tiburcio Tecson and Paula Ocampo. He studied in San Miguel and later, at the Colegio de San Juan de Letran in Intramuros, Manila, where he finished his Bachelor of Arts program.

Early career
Tecson worked as a writer for a Spanish-era magazine, the Catholic Periodical Guide (Pahayagan Patnubay ng Catolico), in Malolos, the county seat of Bulacan; its initial publication being in April 1890.

Military action against Spain
When the revolution against Spain broke out, Tecson was an officer in the Spanish Civil Guards (Guardia Civil) in San Miguel.

Background
In 1896, Tecson co-founded the Arao (Balangay Arao) branch of a secret society-turned-revolutionary government, the Katipunan (Kataastaasang Kagalanggalangang Katipunan, or KKK)(Filipino: nang mga anak nang bayan), which operated out of San Miguel.

On December 14, 1897 the Pact of Biak-na-Bato, was signed in Tecson's residence. It called for a truce between Spanish Colonial Governor-General Fernando Primo de Rivera, and insurgent leader, Emilio Aguinaldo, to end the Philippine Revolution. Aguinaldo and his fellow revolutionaries were given amnesty and money and agreed to go into voluntary exile in Hong Kong. (Aguinaldo later used the money to purchase firearms.) Following Aguinaldo's return from exile in Hong Kong, Tecson defected from the Civil Guards and joined Aguinaldo's Republican Army as a captain.

Following the Cry of Nueva Ecija, he fought alongside General Manuel Tinio (especially in Nueva Ecija) and General Francisco Macabulos. He himself was eventually ranked brigadier general under del Pilar.

Battle of San Miguel
On May 24, 1898, Tecson launched attacks on the Spanish Civil Guard garrisons in San Miguel and San Rafael, Bulacan (collectively known as the Battle of San Miguel); which ended with the Spanish force's surrender on June 1, 1898.

Wartime politics
In 1898, Tecson represented the province of Cagayan at the Malolos Congress (which drafted the Charter of the First Philippine Republic) a few months before the outbreak of the war with America. He cast the deciding vote which addressed the constitutional provision of the separation of church and state.

Military action against the United States

Battle of Quingua
The Battle of Quingua was fought on April 23, 1899, in Quingua, Bulacan (now Plaridel), which resulted in a rout of the Filipinos by their former allies, the United States.

Career and politics following the war
Tecson was elected governor general of Bulacan—the first accepted under American rule, serving from 1902–1906. In 1904, he was named as a delegate of the Philippine's Worlds Fair Commission. Tecson resigned from government service in 1906 and went into farming. He was one of the first to promote the silk culture industry in the Philippines. He returned to government service in 1907, becoming the Secretary of the Department of Agriculture.

Philanthropy, legacy and death
Tecson died on April 30, 1940 and is buried in San Miguel. Before his death, he donated land for a public burial ground for Filipino patriots.

References

Further reading
 Carlos Quirino – Quirino, Carlos. Who's Who in Philippine History. Manila: Tahanan Books, 1995.
 Wenceslao Retana – Retana, W. E.: El Periodismo Filipino (noticias para historia) 1811–1894. Madrid: Viuda de M., Minuesa de los Rios, 1895.
 U.S.A. Library for history; "The Capture of Aguinaldo from America," Book 10;

1859 births
1940 deaths
Colegio de San Juan de Letran alumni
20th-century Filipino businesspeople
Governors of Bulacan
Members of the Malolos Congress
Military history of the Philippines
Nacionalista Party politicians
People from San Miguel, Bulacan
People of the Philippine Revolution
People of the Philippine–American War
Secretaries of Agriculture of the Philippines
Filipino publishers (people)